Arturo de Hoyos (September 21, 1925 - June 12, 2016) was a professor at Brigham Young University (BYU) and president of the Universidad Hispana in Provo, Utah.

Hoyos was born in Piedras Negras, Coahuila, Mexico and raised in Chihuahua State and Sonora State in Northern Mexico.  He served a mission for the Church of Jesus Christ of Latter-day Saints (LDS Church) and then studied at BYU.

De Hoyos married Genevieve Edouarette Argault. Genevieve was born in Autun, France.  She had served a mission in Uruguay.

(Arturo de Hoyos should not be confused with his nephew who is also named Arturo de Hoyos (b. 1959) who is an expert on Freemasonry. This second Arturo de Hoyos was raised in Provo, and is the son of Dr. Benjamin Federico de Hoyos and Josefine Emma Zwahlen).

De Hoyos received a Ph.D. from Michigan State University.  His wife Genevive de Hoyos received her Ph.D. from Indiana University and Arturo was a member of the psychology faculty at that institution. He also served on the faculty of DePauw University for a time.

By 1971 De Hoyos was serving as coordinator of graduate studies for Latino and Native American Students at Brigham Young University.  In 1971 Arturo de Hoyos was also serving as a branch president of what was then the Spanish-American branch in the Utah Stake. The Utah Stake was in 1974 renamed the Provo Central Stake and the Spanish-American branch was thus the ancestor of what is today the Pioneer 5th Branch in the Provo Utah Central Stake.

De Hoyos later served as president of the Mexico Tijuana Mission of the LDS Church.

Arturo and Genevieve conducted several psychological studies related to family structure and stability. They have also written papers on the sociological issues of The Church of Jesus Christ of Latter-day Saints becoming an international institution.

References
Citations

Bibliography
David M. Kennedy Center speaker index
Classic Stories from the Lives of our Prophets, com. by Leon R. Hartshorn. (Salt Lake City: Deseret Book, 1975) p. 377-379.
Universidad Hispana homepage
Arturo DeHoyos and Genevieve DeHoyos, "The Universality of the Gospel", Ensign, August 1971, p. 8
article on schizophrenics by race by the de Hoyoses
article on Universidad Hispana mentioning de Hoyos's formative role in the institution
article by de Hoyoses on pluralism in Mormonism
"New mission presidents", Church News March 24, 1990
Spanish article on the Plan of Salvation by the Hoyoses

1925 births
Brigham Young University alumni
Brigham Young University faculty
DePauw University faculty
Indiana University faculty
2016 deaths
Mexican emigrants to the United States
Mexican leaders of the Church of Jesus Christ of Latter-day Saints
Mexican Mormon missionaries
Michigan State University alumni
Mission presidents (LDS Church)
Mormon missionaries in Mexico
20th-century Mormon missionaries
People from Piedras Negras, Coahuila